Edgar C. Smith (1852–1913) was an American farmer from Markesan, Wisconsin who served two terms (1889–1892) as a Democratic member of the Wisconsin State Assembly from Green Lake County, Wisconsin.

Background 
Smith was born in the Town of Green Lake in Green Lake County on December 28, 1852; attended common schools and a business college, and became by occupation a farmer.

Public office 
He served as town clerk of the town of Green Lake in 1881–1882 and 1883; and in 1884 served as sheriff of Green Lake County.

Smith was elected to the Assembly in 1888 for a two-year term, receiving 1,602 votes against 1,531 votes for Republican H. B. Lowe and 125 votes for Prohibitionist Ira E. Smith (Republican incumbent Charles D. McConnell was not a candidate). He served on the committees for agriculture, town and county organization, and roads and bridges. McConnell attempted to reclaim his seat in 1890, but Smith prevailed, polling 1867 votes to McConnell's 1139 and Prohibitionist J. E. Smith's 61.

Smith was not a candidate for re-election in 1892, and was succeeded by fellow Democrat Orrin Bow. He died in 1913 and was interred in Markesan.

References 

1852 births
1913 deaths
Farmers from Wisconsin
People from Green Lake, Wisconsin
Wisconsin sheriffs
Democratic Party members of the Wisconsin State Assembly
19th-century American politicians